Brad Gilbert was the defending champion.

Gilbert successfully defended his title, defeating Mike Leach 6–2, 6–2 in the final.

Seeds

  Tim Mayotte (first round)
  Brad Gilbert (champion)
  Paul Annacone (second round)
  Matt Anger (second round)
  Ramesh Krishnan (quarterfinals)
  Brian Teacher (first round)
  Greg Holmes (quarterfinals)
  Bud Schultz (first round)

Draw

Finals

Top half

Bottom half

References

External links
 Main draw

1986 Livingston Open
1986 Grand Prix (tennis)